The Board of Intermediate and Secondary Education, Abbottabad, more commonly known as BISE Abbottabad, is an intermediate and secondary education governmental board located in Abbottabad, Khyber Pakhtunkhwa, Pakistan. It is authorized with financial and administrative authority to organize, manage, regulate, develop and control intermediate and secondary education in general and accomplish examinations in the institutions affiliated with it. BISE Abbottabad came into being as a result of the break-up of Peshawar Board in 1990 under the North West Frontier Province Board of Intermediate and Secondary Education Act 1990. The organisation building is located on Murree Road, Abbottabad.

Jurisdiction 
Jurisdiction includes five districts, namely Haripur, Abbottabad, Mansehra, Battagram and Kohistan, encompassing an area of 17,194 square kilometres and a population of 3.47 million.

See also 
 List of educational boards in Pakistan
 Education in Pakistan
 Education in Khyber Pakhtunkhwa

References

External links 
 

Education boards in Khyber Pakhtunkhwa